The 1926 Detroit Panthers season was their fourth in the league and final season as the Panthers. The team failed to improve on their previous output of 8–2–2, winning only four games. They finished twelfth in the league.

Schedule

Standings

Players
John Barrett, center, 11 games, 170 pounds, 5-6, Univ. of Detroit
John Cameron, guard, 8 games, 175 pounds, Kalamazoo, Central Michigan
Jimmy Conzelman, back, 12 games, 175 pounds, 6-0	Washington (MO)
Al Crook, center, 8 games, 190 pounds, 5-10, Washington & Jefferson
Dinger Doane, fullback, 12 games, 190 pounds, 5-10	Tufts
Tom Edwards, tackle, 12 games, 185 pounds, 5-11, Central Michigan, Michigan
Jack Fleischman, guard, 11 games, 184 pounds, 5-6, Purdue	
Bruce Gregory, tailback, 12 games, 170 pounds, 5-10, Michigan
Charlie Grube, end, 2 games, 175 pounds, 5-10, Michigan
Al Hadden, wingback, 12 games, 186 pounds, 5-9, Washington & Jefferson
Norm Harvey, tackle, 8 games, 196 pounds, 6-0, Univ. of Detroit
Vivian Hultman, end, 10 games, 178 pounds, 5-8, Michigan St.
Dutch Lauer, end, 10 games, 185 pounds, 5-10, Univ. of Detroit
Eddie Lynch, end, 12 games, 191 pounds, 6-0, Catholic	
Dutch Marion, fullback, 12 games, 180 pounds, 5-9, Washington & Jefferson, Michigan
Tom McNamara, guard, 11 games, 210 pounds, 5-10, Tufts, Univ. of Detroit	
Eddie Scharer, back, 12 games, 165 pounds, 5-6, Univ. of Detroit, Notre Dame
Gus Sonnenberg, tackle, 12 games, 196 pounds, 5-6, Dartmouth, Univ. or Detroit
Dick Vick, wingback, 6 games, 167 pounds, 5-9, Washington & Jefferson

References

Detroit Panthers seasons
Detroit Wolverines
Detroit Tigers